Xinglong County is a county in the northeast of Hebei province, bordering the municipalities of Beijing to the west and Tianjin to the southwest.

Administrative divisions
There are 9 towns, 9 townships, and 2 ethnic townships under the county's administration.

Climate

Transportation
 Beijing–Chengde Railway
 China National Highway 112

References

External links

County-level divisions of Hebei
Chengde